The Beijing LGBT Center (北京同志中心) is a comprehensive non-profit organization dedicated to improving the living environment for LGBT people in China. The group was founded in 2008 and provides services such as an LGBT-friendly therapist network and a hotline for transgender individuals.

In 2014, the center helped Yang Teng, a gay man, prepare a case against a clinic in Chongqing that had provided him with conversion therapy that included electroshock therapy. The case was successful and also led to search engine Baidu removing listings for conversion therapy. Center employee John Shen and others went undercover for a 2015 episode of Channel 4's Unreported World exposing hospitals that provided electroshock therapy.

Other activism taken by the center has included an event where volunteers wearing blindfolds and t-shirts reading "I am gay" were filmed with their arms out, soliciting hugs from passersby to protest social media platform Weibo's planned ban on gay content. They also partnered with photographer Teo Butturini to create portraits of LGBT individuals living in China. Their research includes a 2017 survey with Peking University on the mental health of transgender Chinese people.

See also 

 Homosexuality in China
 LGBT culture in Beijing
 LGBT rights in China

References

External links 
 Beijing LGBT Center webpage

2008 establishments in China
Human rights in China
LGBT culture in Beijing
LGBT organizations based in China
People's Republic Of China
People's Republic of China
Organizations based in Beijing
Organizations established in 2008